() is the triconsonantal root of many Arabic words.  Many of those words are used as names.  The basic meaning expressed by the root is "good", "handsome" or "beautiful".
This root occurs 194 times in the Qur'an, in 12 derived forms.

Usage

Medicine
Vaccine used for the construct or absolute of vaccine
 Strong (defense) used for someone whose defense system in the body is strong

Names
Hassan, given name 
Hassan, surname 
Hussein, given name and surname
Muhsin, given name

References

External links

Triconsonantal roots